The 1948 Ole Miss Rebels football team represented the University of Mississippi during the 1948 college football season. The Rebels were led by second-year head coach Johnny Vaught and played their home games at Hemingway Stadium in Oxford, Mississippi. Ole Miss finished with just one loss, to rival Tulane, to place second in the Southeastern Conference and 15th in the final AP Poll. They were not invited to a bowl game.

Schedule

Roster
E Barney Poole
E Jackie Poole
G Phillip Poole, Sr.

References

Ole Miss
Ole Miss Rebels football seasons
Ole Miss Rebels football